Swashbuckler is a 1976 American romantic adventure film. The film is based on the story "The Scarlet Buccaneer", written by Paul Wheeler and adapted for the screen by Jeffrey Bloom. It was directed by James Goldstone and was rated PG.

The film was released in the UK as The Scarlet Buccaneer.

Plot 
In Jamaica in 1718, a band of pirates led by Captain "Red" Ned Lynch oppose the greedy acting Governor, the evil Lord Durant. Durant has ruthlessly imprisoned his Lord High Justice (taking over the role himself) and mercilessly evicted the judge's wife and daughter.  The daughter, Jane Barnet, attempts to assassinate Durant by paying Lynch to ambush him at the port.

The ambush fails, resulting in Jane and three of Lynch's crew being captured and sentenced to death. The other prisoners, including the judge, are also awaiting execution.

Lynch returns to the island and joins forces with the local inhabitants to overthrow the military forces and return everything Durant has stolen to its rightful owners. In the process Durant is killed by Lynch and all the prisoners are released.

Cast

Production 
Pirate films had gone out of fashion with major Hollywood studios since the 1950s, due in part to high cost. The success of The Three Musketeers (1973) showed there was still an appetite for swashbucklers, so original producer Eliot Kastner prepared a pirate script where most of the action took place on shore.

"It was prepared to avoid all the hazards of filming on water and it could have been inexpensively made", said co-producer Jennings Lang. "But we decided that it would be cheating the public to do a pirate movie without boats, that would not be using the basic material."

The film was shot in Mexico and on the galleon Golden Hinde, a replica of the Golden Hind captained by English privateer, Francis Drake from 1577 to 1580, which had been moored in San Francisco harbor after a five-month journey to California from England. According to the Special Feature section of the DVD, it was the only pirate movie filmed aboard an actual ship of that era.

"I just hope the audience doesn't think its too small", said Goldstone during production about the ship. "All those Errol Flynn movies—the captain's table was 17 feet long. There are parts of our ship that aren't even that wide."

Anjelica Huston was cast for her role over Martine Beswicke and Barbara Steele. Robert Morgan, a stuntman who lost his leg making How the West Was Won (1963), played a one-legged pirate.
Robert Shaw said during filming:

I'm underplaying this part when all the others are overplaying. I'm trying to be real but I'm also trying to find some sort of contemporary style. It's a mix between 1976 and what we used to call panache. It's as if you were to do Gary Cooper in '76 – I stand apart and alone. In Jaws I was conscious of overplaying. I'm not ashamed of it. I had to bring those American guys up to a certain pitch of energy. But here I'm taking it down and trying to go in the other way. Trying to be real in an unreal situation. I hate all this action, I loathe it. What am I doing running around like this? I'm better off sitting down, playing a scene like I'm talking to you. What I know about life is a fair bit, but it is not contained in sword fights or running up and down the masts of a ship or taking a punch. It's doubly hard because I'm English. English actors are always being asked to play princes or generals or pirate captains. I never get to sit in a booth with a girl and have a conversation.

Geneveive Bujold made the film under her contract with Universal. She said later she did not regret making the film because "Robert Shaw is a man worth knowing."

Director James Goldstone stated during filming:

We're not doing a boffo comedy. We are not making fun of ourselves. One of the cardinal rules here is that every actor really believe what he is doing could actually happen... I hope to evoke all those feelings that audiences felt when they first saw Errol Flynn's movies, but at the same time I realise that if you saw an actual Errol Flynn movie today, marvelous as they were, you'd laugh. My job here is to keep the energy up, the motion moving forward, to maintain a level of joy.
Costume director Burton Miller said:

Instead of researching the period, I took on producer Jennings Lang's challenge for a non-historical approach and started walking along the [Sunset] Strip. I took what groupies and rock stars wear today and took it back 200 years... The film offered more avenues for self expression than anything I'd ever done before. Universal were very generous [with the costume budget].

Release
The working title for the film was Swashbuckler, which was changed during production to The Blarney Cock. "We want to avoid the movie being considered a kid's picture", said Lang. "We wanted a title that is arresting to adults as well as kids. This ship in the movie is called "The Blarney Cock", so we decided to make use of that name as the title."

Before release, however, Universal had a change of heart about the suggestive nature of the title and it was reverted to Swashbuckler.

Reception
The film fared poorly at the box office and was described as an "expensive flop". In Leonard Maltin's annual publication of movie ratings, the film is rated as a "BOMB".

Novelization

References

External links
 
 
 
 
 

1976 films
1970s historical adventure films
American historical adventure films
American action comedy films
American swashbuckler films
American children's films
Films set in the 1710s
Pirate films
1970s English-language films
Films set in Jamaica
Films directed by James Goldstone
Films scored by John Addison
Universal Pictures films
1970s American films